Oraesia cerne is a species of moth of the family Erebidae first described by James Farish Malcolm Fawcett in 1916. It is found in Ghana Ivory Coast, the Democratic Republic of the Congo and Ethiopia.

References
Fawcett, J. M. (1916). "Notes on a collection of Heterocera made by Mr. W. Feather in British East Africa, 1911–13". Proceedings of the Zoological Society of London 2: 707–737, pl. 1.

Calpinae
Insects of the Democratic Republic of the Congo
Insects of West Africa
Insects of Ethiopia
Moths of Africa
Moths described in 1916